Pedro Penedo (born 16 May 1977), better known as Pedro Cazanova, is a Portuguese house music disc jockey and record producer.

Born in Lisbon, Pedro Cazanova achieved mainstream success with his #1 single "Selfish Love" in 2009  and #9 single "My First Luv" in 2010 in Portugal.

He founded the label Symphonik Records in 2013. In 2014 he released his first album "Pedro Cazanova", containing the single "Loose Control".

See also
 Anthony Preston (record producer)

References

External links 
 Biography on the home page of MTV Portugal
  Official Site of Pedro Cazanova
  DJ Rankinglist Portugal
  iTunes Pedro Cazanova

1977 births
Club DJs
Living people
Musicians from Lisbon